The 1977 Virginia Slims of Detroit  was a women's tennis tournament played on indoor carpet courts at the Cobo Hall & Arena  in Detroit, Michigan in the United States that was part of the 1977 Virginia Slims World Championship Series. It was the sixth edition of the tournament and was held from February 22 through February 27, 1977. First-seeded Martina Navratilova won the singles title and earned $20,000 first-prize money.

Finals

Singles
 Martina Navratilova defeated  Sue Barker 6–4, 6–4
 It was Navratilova's 4th singles title of the year and the 11th of her career.

Doubles
 Martina Navratilova /  Betty Stöve defeated  Janet Newberry /  JoAnne Russell 6–3, 6–4

Prize money

References

External links
 Women's Tennis Association (WTA) tournament details
 International Tennis Federation (ITF) tournament edition details

1977 WTA Tour
1977
1977 in sports in Michigan
February 1977 sports events in the United States